Li zite 'ngalera (The Newlyweds on the Galley) is a commedia per musica in three acts by the Italian composer Leonardo Vinci, first performed at the Teatro dei Fiorentini, Naples, on 3 January 1722. The libretto, by Bernardo Saddumene, is written in the Neapolitan language which characterizes it as commeddeja pe mmuseca.

Roles

Synopsis
The young man Carlo abandons his old love Belluccia in favour of a new one, Ciomma. Disguised as a man, Belluccia pursues Carlo. She manages to make several local ladies, including Ciomma herself, fall in love with her. When Belluccia's father, the galley captain Federico, arrives, he threatens Carlo with death, but Belluccia takes pity on him and the couple are reconciled and married. At the end of the opera we see the newlyweds sail back to their old hometown on Federico's galley (hence the title).

Recordings
Li zite 'ngalera, Cappella della Pietà de' Turchini, conducted by Antonio Florio (Opus 111, 1999) 2CDs

References

Further reading
Del Teatro (in Italian)
Magazine de l'opéra baroque (in French)

External links

Opera buffa
Operas
Italian-language operas
1722 operas
Operas by Leonardo Vinci